Nyctomyini is a tribe of New World rats and mice in the subfamily Tylomyinae which includes two genera, Nyctomys and Otonyctomys, each with a single species. Both are medium-sized rats with tawny to brownish fur and a hairy tail.

Classification
Tribe Nyctomyini
Genus Otonyctomys
Hatt's vesper rat, Otonyctomys hatti
Genus Nyctomys
Sumichrast's vesper rat, Nyctomys sumichrasti

References

Musser, G. G. and M. D. Carleton. 2005. Superfamily Muroidea. pp. 894–1531 in Mammal Species of the World a Taxonomic and Geographic Reference. D. E. Wilson and D. M. Reeder eds. Johns Hopkins University Press, Baltimore.

Tylomyinae
Mammal tribes
Taxa named by Guy Musser
Taxa named by Michael D. Carleton